Desislava Ivanova "Dessy" Tenekedjieva (born 12 April 1971) is a Bulgarian actress, singer and film producer.

Early life and education 
Desislava Ivanova Tenekedjieva was born in Varna from a Bulgarian father, Ivan Tenekedjiev, and a Ukrainian-Jewish mother, Tatyana Moisei Holost. She graduated from the French Language School in Varna, and studied in the Krastyo Sarafov National Academy for Theatre and Film Arts, graduating in 1995. Sports are one of Dessy's favorite hobbies. Her older brother, Kiril, is a professor working in Australia. She won numerous cups and awards in tennis tournaments, ski and auto rallies. She has trained as a gymnast and tennis player, won first place in regional and national mathematics olympiads.

Dessy got accepted into the Technical University with the subject “computer machinery and electronics”, and at the same time in VITIZ (nowadays NATFIZ – National Academy for Theatre and Film Arts), however she chose to enter VITIZ.

Biography 
Dessy was only fourteen years old when she made her debut in the film Forbidden for Adults, directed by Plamen Maslarov. Since then, she has been in more than 30 movies. She has acted in international productions and represented Bulgaria at important world cinema forums and festivals.

Some of her more famous films are: Eyes of Crystal, directed by Eros Puglielli – Official Selection at the International Venice Film Festival; Chechenia directed by Leonardo Julliano; Ventitre directed by Duccio Forzano; The Conscience Case directed by Luigi Perelly; The Most Important Things directed by Ivan Andonov; Watchman directed by Ivailo Jamabazov; Killer Rats, directed by Tibor Takach, New Image Company; Il Mеstiere Delle Armi, directed by Ermanno Olmi; Operation Delta Force 4: Deep Fault directed by Mark Roper; La Rivolta del Cittadino directed by Luigi Perelly; The Homecoming by Harold Pinter, directed by Stoyan Kambarev; Rosita, please directed by Ventura Ponce; Camp directed by Georgi Dulgerov.

Playing Maria Medici in the film Il Mеstiere Delle Armi, directed by world-famous movie director Ermanno Olmi, Dessy was the first Bulgarian actress to represent her country at the film fest in Cannes, with a main role in a movie from the official section of the fest. Il Mеstiere Delle Armi received nine David di Donatello awards, the Italian equivalent to the Oscars, including Best Italian Film of the Year.

Dessy Tenekedjieva has acted in theatre productions, including Three Sisters by Anton Chekhov, directed by Stoyan Kambarev, and The Master and Margarita by Mikhail Bulgakov, directed by Teddy Moskov, presented at famous world theater festivals such as Avignon, Edinburgh, Moscow, Jerusalem, Zurich and others. She produced and performed the main part in "LUBOVNIKA.COM" (The Lesson) by Eugène Ionesco (directed by Boiko Bogdanov) in the Little City Theater Off the Channel in Sofia.

Tenekedjieva has a career in music as well. Together with Nikolai Ivanov, she is an author and performer in a musical ethno project, based on Bulgarian folklore. The music videos "Dark" feat John Kaleka, "When It All Ended" feat Miro (KariZma) and her latest song "I Wonder" featuring Magga climbed to the top of the television and radio charts. Dessy Tenekedjieva is a director of music videos, in collaboration with the talented cameraman Georgi Markov. For the "When It All Ended" music video she collaborated with director Ivailo Palmov.

Since 2000, Tenekedjieva and her production company NOVA Film have completed and presented successful musical, theater, cinema and television projects. The official acceptance of Bulgaria in the European Union was celebrated with a concert of Dessy Tenekedjieva and the group INSIDE in the official City Hall in Berlin, Germany. The actress' career drew the attention of the producers of Deutsche Welle’s Euromaxx, and they arrived for the first time in Bulgaria to do a piece about her.

In 2009, she was working with Trinity Studio, music producer Magga and sound director Dimitar Ganchev-Mite on her latest album, Chillout project. From 2000 till 2005 Dessy was the face of the fashion house of Jean Paul Gaultier for Bulgaria, and from 2007–2008 she had an advertising contract with the Japanese giant Suzuki.

Dessy Tenekedjieva is the president of the Stoyan Kambarev Foundation, members of which include twenty of the most important Bulgarian personalities from the country's art world. The foundation was created in memory of theater director and Tenekedjieva's husband, Stoyan Kambarev. The main purpose of the foundation is awarding young artists with unorthodox and original ideas.

References

External links 
 Official website of Dessy Tenekedjieva

21st-century Bulgarian actresses
Actors from Varna, Bulgaria
Bulgarian film actresses
Living people
Musicians from Varna, Bulgaria
1971 births
Bulgarian Jews